In enzymology, a precorrin-2 C20-methyltransferase is an enzyme that catalyzes the chemical reaction

S-adenosyl-L-methionine + precorrin-2  S-adenosyl-L-homocysteine + precorrin-3A

The two substrates of this enzyme are S-adenosyl methionine and precorrin 2 and its two products are S-adenosylhomocysteine and precorrin 3A.

This enzyme belongs to the family of transferases, specifically those transferring one-carbon group methyltransferases.  The systematic name of this enzyme class is S-adenosyl-L-methionine:precorrin-4 C20-methyltransferase and another names in common use is CobI. The enzyme is part of the biosynthetic pathway to cobalamin (vitamin B12) in aerobic bacteria.

See also
 Cobalamin biosynthesis

Structural studies

References

 
 
 

EC 2.1.1
Enzymes of known structure